Lydia Canaan is a Lebanese singer-songwriter and humanitarian activist.

Credited as the first internationally successful Lebanese recording artist, Canaan rose to fame performing rock music in English amid enemy military attacks during the Lebanese Civil War, holding concerts in vicinities of Lebanon that were simultaneously being bombed. Hala Habib of Society wrote, “in a small country that was ripped by war, there was this young girl making a difference”.

Canaan was the first Middle Eastern artist to sing solely in English, and the first to have music videos played on MTV Europe, MTV Southeast Asia, MTV Russia, and MTV Middle East. Her musical debut was described as having defied tradition, challenged convention, and transcended millennia-old gender barriers. According to Arabian Woman, “as a girl who grew up in the midst of a bloody civil war, Canaan was breaking down seemingly insurmountable barriers ... She rocked the establishment”. In 2015, Canaan was cataloged in the Rock and Roll Hall of Fame and Museum's Library and Archives.

Life and career

Early life and education 

Born and raised in Brummana, Lebanon during the Lebanese Civil War to a prominent Greek Orthodox Christian family, Canaan studied at Brummana High School (BHS) and later at Lebanese American University (LAU).

From a young age singing, lyrical composition, and dancing served as an outlet and catharsis for Canaan. At the age of eight, she was awarded the first place prize (in a contest in which all grades competed against each other) by her French elementary school, College des Saints-Coeurs, Bikfaya, for a poem she composed about a child who wept for being scolded for trivial matters such as staining her fingers with ink when she writes.

Raised in a conservative family, Canaan's parents discouraged her from singing rock music and forbid her to have a musical education or formal training. Nevertheless, Canaan cultivated the ability to compose and store melodies and English lyrics by memory alone.

As reported by the newspaper Campus, “For Lydia Canaan's first gig, she had to throw her trademark short rockish black leather skirt and studs out of her bedroom window in Brummana, put on a long skirt, lie to her conservative father about where she was going, and, after changing into her leather gear, singing her teenage heart out as Angel with the band Equation”.

Early career 

In 1984, the teenaged Canaan—under the stage name Angel—joined the heavy metal band Equation, who until then had been intent on finding a male lead singer. Canaan's talent, personality, and stage presence gained her national popularity among Lebanese youth. The same year, she donned what would become her trademark, trend-setting look: revealing, studded leather outfits with dramatic capes and hip-length blonde-streaked hair. Off stage, Canaan's Alma Mater, Brummana High School (BHS), voted her “Best Dressed”. On stage, her provocative costumes contributed to the perception of her as a sex symbol. The Daily Star wrote: “On stage, with her daring looks and style, Canaan became a role model”. At the height of their success the band drew a crowd of over 15,000. Canaan's first original composition, “Why All The Hurt”, a tribute to a deceased friend that she wrote as a teenager, was a No. 1 hit on the radio charts in Lebanon.

Following Canaan's first concert with Equation, a The Gulf Today writer noted, “the first show produced a phenomenal reaction . . . It is incredible that amidst the state of civil war that existed in Lebanon at that time, when most people had no idea if they would see another day, she managed to keep her ambitions alive”. Society magazine stated, “tickets were sold out but more teenagers stormed in to see the young Angel perform... To accommodate the crowd, the concert organizers had to stamp on each fan's hand as they ran out of tickets. It was... հer first success”.

Canaan was hailed by the media as the first “rock star” of the Middle East. Since her first public appearance, Canaan held over 25 sell-out concerts in the country from 1984–1988, and despite the risks and dangers of warring militias and armies, recorded her songs for radio, and topped the charts in Lebanon. Her last concert with Equation was held in 1986.

Solo career 

In 1987, Canaan embarked on a solo career, performing her original compositions, such as “To Oblivion and Back”, “Does it Need Some Action”, “A Hard Situation”, “Hey Richie”, and “The Christmas Wish”, all which were radio hits.

As Canaan's music evolved, her fame grew. With Lebanon under Syrian occupation, Canaan's concerts were held in East Beirut, Mount Lebanon, and the north of Lebanon. In Tripoli, the second largest city in Lebanon, Canaan performed in front of a sold-out crowd under tight security despite having received death threats.

In 1987, Canaan performed to a crowd of 20,000 at the Beirut Rock Festival. In 1988, she held sell-out concerts for three consecutive nights at Casino du Liban, the last performer to grace its stage until it resumed activity following the end of the Liberation War in 1990.

International success 
Canaan's international breakthrough was widely reported on by the Arab media, Al-Hayat writing that she had “ ... invaded the European market with her ballads”. In 1989, she left Lebanon and settled in Zurich, Switzerland, where she became a naturalized Swiss citizen. There she took vocal lessons with soprano Anita Monti. In 1990, she was interviewed by Radio Z in Zurich, where her songs received airplay.

In 1991, Canaan began working with record producer David Richards (producer of Queen and David Bowie). The same year, she gave a live interview for NBC Europe. Also in 1991, Canaan signed a two-year contract with London-based production company Spinny Music (led by Queen manager Jim Beach) to write and record her original songs “Shine”, “Never Set You Free”, “So Much to Give”, “Desire”, “Love”, and a cover of Shirley Bassey’s English version of “Never Never Never”, produced by David Richards at Mountain Studios in Montreux, Switzerland. The same year, she recorded the duet “Love and Lust” with Queen drummer Roger Taylor.

In 1993, Canaan recorded songs “Libnan”, “Fallin'”, and her cover of John Lennon’s “Gimme Some Truth”.

Transition to pop

"Beautiful Life" 

In February 1995, Canaan, who had up until that time performed rock under the stage name Angel, dropped the moniker, and under her birth name Lydia Canaan presented the pop ballad “Beautiful Life” (produced by Barry Blue and The Rapino Brothers) at the Midem in Cannes, France. That Spring, Canaan's international release of the single “Beautiful Life” by London-based Pulse-8 Records gained her international critical acclaim, the buzz culminating in a promo tour in England and radio airplay in the UK, Europe, South Africa, and the Middle East.

Canaan performed “Beautiful Life” at the launch of MTV Europe held in Beirut on May 12, 1995. In promoting the event, MTV Europe billed her as “the diva from the Middle East”. During the press conference, President of MTV Europe Peter Einstein stated, “MTV is proud and privileged to play Lydia's videos on Music-Non-Stop Show ... All at MTV have fallen in love with Lydia, her songs, and her performance.”

"Guardian Angel" 
In early 2000, “Guardian Angel”, Canaan's duet with Robin Scott, appeared on M's album Famous Last Words, released by BMG Music.

"The Sound of Love" 
Canaan's second single, “The Sound of Love”, produced by Barry Blue and The Rapino Brothers and recorded at the Maison Rouge Studios in London, was released in 1997. In 1998, Canaan's recordings, made in New York City at Jay Ward's Dogbrain Music, were exhibited on billboardtalentnet.com, a web site promoting unsigned talent, and appeared on its RadioBTN top 10 chart.

Canaan's debut studio album, The Sound of Love, was released in the summer of 2000. Recorded in London and New York City and including the track “Right on the Verge”, featuring Tommy Mandel. The album was distributed by SIDI/XEMA in Saudi Arabia, Kuwait, UAE, Bahrain, Qatar, Oman, Egypt, Jordan, and Lebanon. In support of the album release, Canaan performed various venues in Beirut, Jumeira Beach Hotel in Dubai, and Savage Garden Club and Rifaa Golf Club in Manama, Bahrain.

"Libnan" 

In 2004, “Libnan” was chosen as the title song of the advertisement “Rediscover Lebanon”, produced and broadcast by CNN and commissioned by the Lebanese Ministry of Economy & Trade to promote Lebanon as a tourist destination.

"Never Set You Free" 
In 2014, Canaan was named a semi-finalist by the UK Songwriting Contest for her song “Never Set You Free”.

Activism and humanitarian work

Activism 

In 2014, Canaan was compelled toward activism as a United Nations delegate for Khiam Rehabilitation Center for Victims of Torture (KRC) to the United Nations Human Rights Council (UNHRC).
 On March 17, 2014, Canaan delivered her speech, “Islamophobia and Art”, about the need to combat anti-Muslim prejudice artistically, at the 25th Session of the United Nations Human Rights Council at the Palais des Nations in Geneva, Switzerland, gaining a round of applause and kudos.
 On June 17, 2014, Canaan delivered her speech, “Hostage to Injustice”, a call for an end to unjust political imprisonment, at the 26th Session of the United Nations Human Rights Council at the Palais des Nations in Geneva, Switzerland, receiving a standing ovation and drawing media attention.
 On March 13, 2015, Canaan delivered her speech, “Humane Evolution”, in which she spoke out against sanctioned torture, at the 28th Session of the United Nations Human Rights Council at the Palais des Nations in Geneva, Switzerland, winning her extended applause.
 On November 3, 2015, Canaan delivered a speech condemning governments worldwide for failure to implement UN human rights recommendations at the UNHRC's 23rd Session of the Universal Periodic Review (UPR), attended by over twenty-five delegations and representatives from Great Britain, Germany, Norway, France, the European Union, Denmark, Australia, Ireland, and Lebanon, among others at the Palais des Nations in Geneva, Switzerland. She also sang an a cappella verse of her activist anthem “Humanity Wake Up and Fight”.
 On March 18, 2016, Canaan delivered “Fighting Terrorism Without Violating Human Rights”, her impassioned speech in defense of innocent civilian victims of counter-terrorism, at the 31st Session of the United Nations Human Rights Council (UNHRC) at the Palais des Nations in Geneva, Switzerland. It was streamed live on YouTube by the Universal Periodic Review (UPR).
 On March 14, 2017, Canaan delivered her speech titled “Global Effects of the Persecution of Religious Minorities in the Middle East”, which primarily focused on the persecution of Christians (who, according to her speech, are the most persecuted religious minority in the Middle East and the world), at the 34th Session of the United Nations Human Rights Council (UNHRC) at the Palais des Nations in Geneva, Switzerland; her emotional delivery ended with Canaan in tears.

Humanitarian work 

 In 2001, Canaan performed at the United Nations International Volunteers Day in Beirut and was awarded for her humanitarianism by Yves de San, Head of UNDP Lebanon.
 In 2014, Canaan participated in the Arab International Forum in Solidarity With Palestinian Prisoners, held in Beirut, Lebanon, with over three hundred fifty public figures and other international attendees, headed by former U.S. Attorney General Ramsey Clark.
 In 2015, Canaan took part in the International Forum for Justice in Palestine, held in Beirut, Lebanon, with over five hundred attendees from the U.S., Europe, and the Middle East, headed by former U.S. Attorney General Ramsey Clark.

Canaan supports Solitary Watch, John Legend's Free America campaign, Human Rights Watch, War Child Holland-Lebanon, SAWA for DEV & AID, and the International Campaign to Prosecute War Crimes in Iraq chaired by former U.S. Attorney General Ramsey Clark.

Charity work 

Throughout her life, Canaan has donated her money, music, and time to many charities, particularly those concerned with children, animals, and the elderly. She reportedly made generous donations to the Children's Care Unit of Salmaniyah Hospital, Child Fund International (CFI), and St. Jude's Hospital, and has performed at charity and fundraiser events including American Women's Club, Salmaniyah Hospital (Children's Care Unit), Beirut Rotary Club, American Community School, Association pour la Promotion Feminine, Caritas Internationalis (Liban), Centre Renee Wehbe Le Vieillard Malade, Beirut for the Ethical Treatment of Animals (BETA), Lions Beirut Code Club, Unite Lebanon Youth Project (ULYP), Arab Resource Center for Popular Arts, Al-Jana (ARCPA), Social Support Society Active Ageing House, NASMA Foundation, and Association Amour et Partage.

Her song, “Beautiful Life”, was selected by South African President Nelson Mandela as the theme song for a charity event in South Africa.

Advocacy 

 In 2015, Canaan performed at a rally in solidarity with Cardinal Patriarch Bechara Boutros Al-Rahi's call to elect a president of the Republic of Lebanon at St. George Cathedral in Beirut.

Support for animal welfare 
Canaan, an outspoken animal welfare supporter and animal rights activist, supports the Asian Conservation Awareness Programme (ACAP/WildAid), the World Wildlife Fund (WWF), Le Roselet Foundation, and Beirut for the Ethical Treatment of Animals (BETA).

Public speaking 
 In 2001, Canaan was invited as Speaker of the Month by American Community School (ACS) in Beirut, Lebanon.
 Canaan delivered the speech “It's About Time, My Country” in support of the Lebanese Armed Forces on Independence Day 2014 at Casino du Liban in Beirut, Lebanon.

Film and literature

Film 

In 2014, Canaan was interviewed by America-based Global Sorority Foundation for their documentary film series as a prime example for young girls worldwide to overcome adversity and raise awareness for gender equality.

Literature 
American author Robert W. McGee mentioned Canaan's songs “So Much To Give” and “Never Set You Free” in his two novels Justifiable Homicide (2014) and Annie and the Senator (2015); Canaan and her songs “Shine”, “Fallin'”, and “Libnan” were referenced in all three volumes of McGee's The Iraqi Girl Trilogy (2015).  McGee's characters often risk their lives to listen to Lydia Canaan's music.

In 2017, Canaan was featured in British journalist for Newsweek Orlando Crowcroft's book Rock in a Hard Place: Music and Mayhem in the Middle East, about the dangers she faced and obstacles she overcame as a rock music pioneer in Lebanon.

Honors and awards

Honors 

 On January 16, 2002, Canaan was received by Lebanese President Emile Lahoud at the Presidential Palace in Baabda, Lebanon. President Lahoud thanked Canaan for her devotion to, affection for, and altruistic services rendered to her country.
 On January 28, 2002, Canaan was received by First Lady of Lebanon Andree Lahoud at the Presidential Palace, who expressed her gratitude and admiration for Canaan for putting a positive cultural and artistic face on Lebanon.
 On February 15, 2002, Canaan was received by the First Lady Andree Lahoud at the Presidential Palace, who requested that Canaan hold a concert at the Presidential Palace in honor of the wives of the fallen Republican Guard Officers.
 On Mother's Day, March 21, 2002, Canaan was received at the Presidential Palace when, upon the request of First Lady Andree Lahoud, she performed for a presidential ceremony in honor of the wives of the fallen Republican Guard Officers.

Awards

Videography

Music videos

Concerts

Oration

Discography

Studio albums 

Track listing

Singles

See also 
 List of women's firsts
 Music history
 Women in music
 List of animal rights advocates
 List of peace activists

References

External links 

 
 Lydia Canaan in the Rock and Roll Hall of Fame and Museum's Library and Archives
 Lydia Canaan discography at Discogs
 
 

Living people
Year of birth missing (living people)
Singers with a three-octave vocal range
Women singer-songwriters
English-language singers from Lebanon
Women rock singers
Ballad musicians
21st-century Lebanese women singers
Lebanese emigrants to Switzerland
Lebanese Christians
Lebanese human rights activists
Lebanese pacifists
Greek Orthodox Christians from Lebanon
20th-century Lebanese women singers